From the Journals of Jean Seberg is a 1995 docudrama type found footage film on the life of actress Jean Seberg. It is directed by Mark Rappaport.

External links

Documentary films about actors
1995 films
American independent films
Documentary films about women in film
American documentary films
1990s English-language films
1990s American films